PAM CUT–Center for an Untold Tomorrow, formerly the Northwest Film Center is a regional media arts resource and service organization based in Portland, Oregon, United States that was founded to encourage the study, appreciation, and utilization of film. The center provides a variety of film and video exhibition, education and information programs primarily directed to the residents of Oregon, Washington, Idaho, Montana and Alaska.

History
The center was founded as the Northwest Film Study Center in 1971, and incorporated into the Portland Art Museum in 1978.

The center was located in Portland's historic Guild Theatre from 1998 to 2006.

Sponsors of the center include the National Endowment for the Arts, Oregon Arts Commission, Oregon Cultural Trust, Washington State Arts Commission, Regional Arts & Culture Council, The Ted R. Gamble Film Endowment, The Rose E. Tucker Charitable Trust, The Paul G. Allen Foundation for the Arts, Academy of Motion Picture Arts and Sciences, and the Mt. Hood Cable Regulatory Commission.

In March 2022, the center was renamed the "PAM CUT–Center for an Untold Tomorrow".

Management 
In September 2019, Amy Dotson became the director of Portland's Northwest Film Center. Dotson would be responsible for the Film Center's overall vision, including strategic development, marketing, and guidance of the curriculum. She would also work with the curatorial teams of the Museum, incorporating her vast film and new media knowledge, as well as using her financial, commercial and foreign partnerships to promote the development of the Film Center as a world-class film and digital media production hub.

Events 

Events at the Northwest Film Center include the Portland International Film Festival, the Northwest Filmmakers' Festival, Reel Music Film Festival, Portland Jewish Film Festival and the Young People's Film Festival.

Past judges of the Northwest Filmmakers' Festival (previously known as the Northwest Film and Video Festival) have included Gus Van Sant, Matt Groening, Todd Haynes, Christine Vachon, Bill Plympton, Dan Ireland, Karen Cooper of Filmforum, B. Ruby Rich, Amy Taubin, J. Hoberman, and John Cooper, Sundance Film Festival and Outfest programmer.

References 

 

Culture of Portland, Oregon
Organizations based in Portland, Oregon
Film schools in the United States
Film archives in the United States
Cinemas and movie theaters in Oregon
1971 establishments in Oregon
Portland Art Museum